Shri Atal Bihari Vajpayee Government Medical College, Faridabad, established in 2022, is a full-fledged tertiary Government Medical college and hospital. This college is located at Faridabad in Haryana. The college imparts the degree of Bachelor of Medicine and Surgery (MBBS). The college is recognized by National Medical Commission and is affiliated with the Pandit Bhagwat Dayal Sharma University of Health Sciences. Like all other Indian medical colleges, students are admitted in this college on the basis of merit through National Eligibility and Entrance Test. The hospital associated with this college is one of the largest hospitals in Faridabad.

Courses
Shri Atal Bihari Vajpayee Government Medical College, Faridabad undertakes the education and training of students in MBBS courses.

References

Educational institutions established in 2022
Medical colleges in Haryana